Lukas Dauser (born 15 June 1993) is a German male artistic gymnast and a two-time Olympian, having competed at the 2016 and 2020 Olympic Games.  He is the 2020 Olympic and 2022 World silver medalist on the parallel bars.

Career 
Dauser became a member of the first German gymnastics league at the age of 19. He formerly trained in Berlin, although he represented two gymnastics clubs – TSV Unterhaching and KTV Straubenhardt from Bavaria and Baden-Württemberg.

His major international debut came at the 2014 World Championships in Nanjing, PRC. There, he placed eighth as a member of the German squad in the team all-around tournament. On that same year, Dauser performed a new element on the parallel bars during the Challenge Cup in Anadia, Portugal. Due to its complexity, the International Gymnastics Federation officially named an element on the parallel bars after him, involving a giant swing backward with Makuts to upper arm hang.

In 2016, Dauser became the national champion on parallel bars, scoring even more points than Marcel Nguyen, the country's previous leader on parallel bars. At the pre-Olympic qualification, the German team ranked first, with Dauser capping off the meet in fourth position on the parallel bars. On 10 July, Andreas Hirsch, head coach of the German national team, proposed that Dauser would be included in the national team to the 2016 Summer Olympics in Rio de Janeiro. There, Dauser, along with the German quintet of Andreas Bretschneider, Fabian Hambüchen, Marcel Nguyen, and Andreas Toba, scored a total of 261.275 points to take the seventh position in the team all-around final.

Dauser won a silver medal in the men's parallel bars event at the 2020 Summer Olympics in Tokyo, Japan.

Dauser competed at the 2022 European Championships in Munich, where he finished ninth in the all-around. Additionally, he qualified to the parallel bars final, and helped Germany qualify to the team final.

Competitive history

References

External links

 
 Lukas Dauser at KTV Straubenhardt 
 Lukas Dauser at German Gymnastics Federation 
 
 
 

1993 births
Living people
German male artistic gymnasts
Sportspeople from Upper Bavaria
Gymnasts at the 2016 Summer Olympics
Olympic gymnasts of Germany
Gymnasts at the 2020 Summer Olympics
Medalists at the 2020 Summer Olympics
Olympic medalists in gymnastics
Olympic silver medalists for Germany
Medalists at the World Artistic Gymnastics Championships
20th-century German people
21st-century German people
People from Ebersberg (district)